In enzymology, a coenzyme F420 hydrogenase is an enzyme that catalyzes the chemical reaction

H2 + coenzyme F420  reduced coenzyme F420

Thus, the two substrates of this enzyme are H2 and coenzyme F420, whereas its product is reduced coenzyme F420.

This enzyme belongs to the family of oxidoreductases, specifically those acting on hydrogen as donor with other, known, acceptors.  The systematic name of this enzyme class is hydrogen:coenzyme F420 oxidoreductase. Other names in common use include 8-hydroxy-5-deazaflavin-reducing hydrogenase, F420-reducing hydrogenase, and coenzyme F420-dependent hydrogenase.  This enzyme participates in folate biosynthesis and is a critical part of energy conservation in some methanogens such as Methanosarcina barkeri.  It has 3 cofactors: iron, nickel, and deazaflavin.

References

 
 
 
 
 

EC 1.12.98
Iron enzymes
Nickel enzymes
Enzymes of unknown structure